The 2001 American League Championship Series (ALCS) was a rematch of the 2000 ALCS between the New York Yankees, who had come off a dramatic comeback against the Oakland Athletics in the Division Series after being down two games to zero, and the Seattle Mariners, who also rallied to win their Division Series in five games over the Cleveland Indians. The series had additional poignancy, coming immediately after downtown New York City was devastated by the September 11 attacks (the series was played in late October, due to Major League Baseball temporarily shutting down in the wake of the attacks).

Though the Mariners had won an American League record 116 regular season games (tying the major league record established by the 1906 Chicago Cubs, and had home field advantage, the Yankees won the first two games in Seattle. Mariners' manager Lou Piniella, a former Yankee player and manager, guaranteed after Game 2 that the Mariners would win at least two of the next three games in New York to return the series to Seattle. The visitors won a blowout in Game 3, but lost a tight Game 4, and the Yankees closed out the best-of-seven series in New York with a 12–3 rout in Game 5 for their fourth-straight league pennant.

The Yankees then attempted to win a fourth consecutive World Series title, but lost a close seventh game on the road to the Arizona Diamondbacks.

Summary

Seattle Mariners vs. New York Yankees

Game summaries

Game 1
Wednesday, October 17, 2001 at Safeco Field in Seattle, Washington

The starting date of October 17 was the latest ever for a League Championship Series (the regular season concluded on Sunday, October 7.) The Yankees took a 1–0 lead on a Chuck Knoblauch single that scored Jorge Posada in the second off Aaron Sele, then increased it to 3–0 on a Paul O'Neill two-run home run in the fourth. The Mariners got on the board on a John Olerud groundout that scored Edgar Martínez in the fifth off Andy Pettitte.

The score remained 3–1 until the ninth, when the Yankees increased their lead to 4–1 off Jose Paniagua on a David Justice single that scored Alfonso Soriano, who singled and stole second. The Mariners got that run back in the bottom of the inning when Mariano Rivera threw a wild pitch to Bret Boone that scored Ichiro Suzuki, who doubled with one out and went to third on another wild pitch, but Rivera retired Boone and Martínez to end the game.

Game 2
Thursday, October 18, 2001 at Safeco Field in Seattle, Washington

New York took a 2–0 lead in the second against Freddy García on a Scott Brosius double that scored Tino Martinez and Jorge Posada, who singled and walked, respectively. Brosius then scored on a Chuck Knoblauch single two batters later to make it 3–0 Yankees. The Mariners responded in the fourth on a two-run home run from Stan Javier off Mike Mussina after Mike Cameron was hit by a pitch to make it a one-run game. That ended the scoring and the Yankees took a 2–0 series lead back to The Bronx.

This was the most recent MLB postseason game played in Seattle until Game 3 of the 2022 ALDS.

Game 3
Saturday, October 20, 2001 at Yankee Stadium (I) in Bronx, New York

The Yankees jumped to a 2–0 lead in the first on a Bernie Williams two-run home run off Jamie Moyer after David Justice walked. But they did not score again until the eighth on a David Justice RBI single off Jose Paniagua. Orlando Hernández pitched four shutout innings before letting the Mariners load the bases on two walks and a single in the fifth. Bret Boone's single scored two to tie the game. Next inning, John Olerud's lead-off home run put the Mariners up 3−2, their first lead in the series. After allowing a single and walk, Hernández was relieved by Mike Stanton. An error allowed another run to score and put runners on second and third. After David Bell flied out, Ichiro Suzuki was intentionally walked to load the bases and Mark McLemore cleared them with a triple. Mark Wohlers relieved Stanton and gave up a two-run home run to Boone to make it 9−2.

In the seventh inning, with runners on first and third on a walk and error, Bell's single scored Cameron. Jay Witasick relieved Wohlers and, after getting two outs, allowed an RBI single to Boone. Next inning, Stan Javier hit a leadoff single, moved to third on two ground outs, and scored on Bell's single off Witasick. In the ninth, Witasick allowed a one-out home run to Jay Buhner, then a triple to Al Martin, who scored on Olerud's single. John Halama retired the Yankees in order to end the game, a 14–3 Mariners win which guaranteed a Game 5.

Game 4
Sunday, October 21, 2001 at Yankee Stadium (I) in Bronx, New York

Starting pitchers Paul Abbott and Roger Clemens both lasted only five innings, but Game 4 remained scoreless until the top of the eighth. Seattle's Bret Boone hit a solo home run off reliever Ramiro Mendoza for the game's first tally, but the Yankees responded in the bottom of the inning with a Bernie Williams home run to right on a full count off Arthur Rhodes to tie the game. Mariano Rivera retired the side in order in the ninth, and Mariners closer Kazuhiro Sasaki got the first out, then allowed an infield single by Scott Brosius. The next hitter was rookie Alfonso Soriano, whose walk-off home run to right-center won the game, 3–1.

Through the seventh, each team had just one hit: John Olerud's leadoff single in the fourth off Clemens for the Mariners, and Tino Martinez's ground-rule double off Norm Charlton in the sixth for the Yankees. Abbott held New York hitless through the first five, but with eight walks; the Seattle bullpen issued two more walks while the Yankees gave up five total, four by Clemens. New York took a 3–1 series lead with another home game on Monday.

Game 5
Monday, October 22, 2001 at Yankee Stadium (I) in Bronx, New York

In the bottom of the third inning, an error by Mariner third baseman David Bell allowed Scott Brosius to reach base. Alfonso Soriano then singled and both men advanced a base on Chuck Knoblauch's sacrifice bunt. Derek Jeter's sacrifice fly and David Justice's double scored a run each, then Bernie Williams capped the scoring with a two-run home run off Aaron Sele, all four runs unearned. Paul O'Neill homered in the fourth to put the Yankees up 5–0. In the sixth, Mariners reliever John Halama allowed three straight singles to load the bases with no outs. Joel Piñeiro relieved him and struck out Brosius, but then threw a wild pitch to Soriano to let all three runners move up. Soriano walked to reload the bases before Knoblauch's single, Jeter's walk, and Justice's single scored a run each, and New York led 9–0 with three innings remaining.

The Mariners got their only runs in the seventh when they loaded the bases on three singles with one out: a single by Bell scored two, followed by a single by Ichiro Suzuki scoring another off Andy Pettitte. In the bottom of the eighth, Tino Martinez hit a three-run home run off José Paniagua, and Mariano Rivera pitched a scoreless ninth as the Yankees cruised to a 12–3 win and advanced to a fourth consecutive World Series.

Composite linescore
2001 ALCS (4–1): New York Yankees over Seattle Mariners

Aftermath

The Yankees' streak of consecutive World Series wins ended at three, as they fell to the Arizona Diamondbacks in seven games. They made the World Series again in 2003, but lost to the underdog Florida Marlins, and did not win another World Series until 2009.

This was the end of the Mariners and Yankees' short-lived rivalry that started with a bang in the 1995 American League Division Series, which is considered one of the best non-World Series postseason series ever.

The Mariners' 116 wins in the regular season remain the most for an American League team and tied with the 1906 Cubs as the most in MLB. Despite their success under manager Piniella, the team went on a downward slide from which they have never recovered. (Piniella left in 2002.) They did not return to the postseason until 2022.

To the dismay of many Mariners fans, Ichiro would be traded from Seattle to the New York Yankees during the 2012 season, ending his eleven-year run with the team. Ichiro was a Yankee until 2014 before signing a series of one-year contracts with the Marlins until 2017. Ichiro ended his career with the Mariners in 2019 at the age of 45 and was inducted into the Seattle Mariners Hall of Fame in August 2022.

Notes

External links
2001 ALCS at Baseball-Reference

American League Championship Series
American League Championship Series
New York Yankees postseason
Seattle Mariners postseason
American League Championship Series
American League Championship Series
American League Championship Series
American League Championship Series
Baseball competitions in Seattle
2000s in the Bronx
Baseball competitions in New York City